Rikos Records is a small independent record label in Jyväskylä, Finland, founded in 1999 by producers Janne Granberg (DJ CMOS) and Heikki Halme (DJ KKP). Although it is known for its electronic releases, it does not focus on any specific genre. It is also known for its club events, most of them organized in Jyväskylä.

Discography (partial)
Laulurastas: Sienet ja LSD 7-inch (rikos013)
Roger That 7-inch (rikos015)
Itäväylä 12-inch LP/CD (rikos012/rikos012cd)
VCS2600 12-inch EP (rikos011)
Vapauskysymys 7-inch EP (rikos010)
Tero: Cracker's Revenge 12-inch LP (rikos00F)
Mesak: Sijoitus Tulevaisuuteen 12-inch EP (rikos00E)
Ercola: Bonus Level 12-inch EP (rikos00D)
Alkuperäinen 7-inch (rikos00C)
Tero: Bombs Away 7-inch (rikos00B)
Dr.Robotnik: Warnings 7-inch (rikos00A)
Laulurastas: Aika Hiljasta/Loputon 7-inch (rikos009)
Polytron: Disco Polytron/Insertion of Diskette 7-inch (rikos008)
Laulurastas: Onni & Versio 7-inch (rikos007)
Dr.Robotnik: Death and Destruction 12-inch LP (rikos006)
Lackluster: 7-inch (rikos005)
Puola: Invisible Sightseeing CD (rikos004)
Tero: First Blood 12-inch minilp (rikos003)
The Dr.Robotnik EP 12-inch (rikos002)
RIKOS001: A beginner's guide to rikos CD-R (rikos001)

See also
 List of record labels
 List of independent UK record labels

External links
 Official site

Finnish independent record labels
Record labels established in 1999
Electronic music record labels
1999 establishments in Finland